Floyd Scott Hamilton (November 21, 1921 – April 11, 1976) was an American basketball player and coach.

A Grafton, West Virginia native, Hamilton played college basketball for the West Virginia Mountaineers. As a junior in the 1941–42 season, Hamilton led the Mountaineers to the 1942 National Invitation Tournament and was named an All-American by the Helms Athletic Foundation at the end of the season. He was the first WVU basketball player to earn this designation.

Following the close of his college career in 1943, Hamilton joined the Navy to fight in World War II and upon his return played for a variety of professional and semi-professional teams and was drafted by the Baltimore Bullets of the Basketball Association of America (BAA), though he never played for the team. He began coaching in 1947 as the head coach for Welch High School in Welch, West Virginia and in 1950 made a move to the college ranks as he was named head coach for Washington and Lee. Hamilton coached the Generals for two seasons, compiling a record of 13–39, before resigning in 1952.

Hamilton spent the majority of his remaining years as a high school coach and administrator. He died on April 11, 1976 at age 54.

References

External links
College statistics

1921 births
1976 deaths
All-American college men's basketball players
American men's basketball coaches
American men's basketball players
Baltimore Bullets (1944–1954) draft picks
Basketball coaches from West Virginia
Basketball players from West Virginia
College men's basketball head coaches in the United States
High school basketball coaches in Virginia
High school basketball coaches in West Virginia
People from Grafton, West Virginia
Point guards
United States Navy personnel of World War II
Washington and Lee Generals men's basketball coaches
West Virginia Mountaineers men's basketball players